Monanthes is a genus of small, succulent, subtropical plants of the family Crassulaceae. The about ten species are mostly endemic to the Canary Islands and Savage Islands, with some found on Madeira. Its center of diversity is Tenerife, with seven species occurring on this island. On Fuerteventura and Lanzarote, only M. laxiflora occurs.
Monanthes is a rare example where a species re-colonizes the continent from an island, after their ancestors have colonized the island from the continent.

Monanthes are not frost-resistant. They are linked with the genera Sempervivum, Greenovia, Aichryson and Aeonium, which is obvious from their similar flowers.

Species of Monanthes differ considerably in life- and growth-form. M. icterica, which is also genetically quite distant to other Monanthes species, is annual, while the other species are perennial.

Taxonomy
Accepted species include:
 Monanthes anagensis Praeger
 Monanthes atlantica J.Ball
 Monanthes brachycaulos (Webb & Bertholt) R.Lowe
 Monanthes icterica (Webb ex Bolle) Christ
 Monanthes laxiflora (DC.) Bolle ex Bornmuller
 Monanthes lowei (Paiva) Perez & Acebes
 Monanthes minima (Bolle) Christ
 Monanthes muralis Hook.f.
 Monanthes pallens (Webb in Christ) Christ
 Monanthes polyphylla (Aiton) Haw.
 Monanthes polyphylla subsp. amydros Nyffeler
 Monanthes subcrassicaulis (Kuntze) Praeger
 Monanthes subrosulata Bañares & A. Acev.-Rodr.
 Monanthes tilophila (Bolle) Christ
 Monanthes wildpretii Bañares & S.Scholz

Etymology
Monanthes is Greek for "single flower".

References

Bibliography

 Mes, T. H. M., Wijers, G. J. & Hart, H. (1997). :Phylogenetic relationships in Monanthes (Crassulaceae) based on morphological, chloroplast and nuclear DNA variation". Journal of Evolutionary Biology 10(2):193–216.

External links

 
Flora of Madeira
Flora of the Canary Islands
Crassulaceae genera